Hermann Panzo (February 8, 1958 – July 30, 1999 in Fort de France, Martinique) was a French athlete who mainly competed in the 100 metres. He was twice French 100 metre champion.

In 1977, he won the gold medal of the 100 metres in the junior European championship. He established a new European record on the 100 metres for the juniors (10"40). In 1977 too, he beat the European junior record for the relay 4 x 100 metres (39"69).

He competed for France at the 1980 Summer Olympics held in Moscow, Soviet Union. He was finalist in the 100 metres where he finished 8th and, in the 4 x 100 metre relay, he won the bronze medal with his team mates Antoine Richard, Pascal Barré and Patrick Barré.

In 1981 he finished 3rd in the European cup 100 metres, but afterwards he won the 100 metres of the "Golden sprint" (Berlin, ISTAF 08/21), which was the most important competition of the year. In 10"14, he beat the Olympic champion Allan Wells (10.15) and the best American sprinters (Philips 10.21, Latteny 10.25, and Floyd 10.34). For the anecdote, we can mention that Panzo also beat the Canadian sprinter Ben Johnson on that run.

He died on July 30, 1999 of a cerebral vascular accident.

References

1958 births
1999 deaths
Martiniquais athletes
French male sprinters
Olympic bronze medalists for France
Athletes (track and field) at the 1980 Summer Olympics
Olympic athletes of France
French people of Martiniquais descent
Medalists at the 1980 Summer Olympics
Olympic bronze medalists in athletics (track and field)
20th-century French people